Preston Township is an inactive township in Jasper County, in the U.S. state of Missouri.

Preston Township takes its name from the community of Preston.

References

Townships in Missouri
Townships in Jasper County, Missouri